Shitou may refer to:

 Stone City, ancient fortified city within Nanjing
 Shitou Xiqian, 8th-century Chinese Zen Buddhist teacher and author
 Shitou, Lujiang County, town in Lujiang County, Anhui
 Shitou, Rong County, Guangxi, town in Rong County, Guangxi
Shitou, Chinese actress, director, filmmaker, and lesbian activist